Horný Bar is a village and municipality in the Dunajská Streda District in the Trnava Region of south-west Slovakia.

Geography
The municipality lies at an altitude of 121 metres (397 ft) and covers an area of 11.77 km2 (4.5 sq mi).

History
In the 9th century, the territory of Horný Bar became part of the Kingdom of Hungary.
In historical records the village was first mentioned in 1245. Until the end of World War I, it was part of Hungary and fell within the Dunaszerdahely district of Pozsony County. After the Austro-Hungarian army disintegrated in November 1918, Czechoslovakian troops occupied the area. Under the Treaty of Trianon of 1920, it became officially part of Czechoslovakia and fell within Bratislava County until 1927. In November 1938, the First Vienna Award granted the area to Hungary and it was held by Hungary until 1945. After Soviet occupation in 1945, Czechoslovakian administration returned and the village became officially part of Czechoslovakia by the Paris Peace Treaties in 1947.

Demography 
At the 2001 Census the recorded population of the village was 1,075 while an end-2008 estimate by the Institute of Informatics and Statistics had the villages's population as 1,253. At the 2001 census, 89.21% of its residents reported themselves as Hungarian and 9.77% as Slovak. It's reported Roman Catholicism being professed by 94.98% of the total population.

Notable people 
László Batthyány-Strattmann was born here in 1870

See also
 List of municipalities and towns in Slovakia

References

Genealogical resources

The records for genealogical research are available at the state archive "Statny Archiv in Bratislava, Slovakia"
 Roman Catholic church records (births/marriages/deaths): 1676-1912 (parish A)
 Lutheran church records (births/marriages/deaths): 1823-1946 (parish B)

External links
Surnames of living people in Horny Bar

Villages and municipalities in Dunajská Streda District
Hungarian communities in Slovakia